Tomocyclus is a genus of sea snails, marine gastropod mollusks in the subfamily Megalomastomatinae  of the family Megalomastomatidae .

Species
 Tomocyclus fistulosus F. G. Thompson, 1963
 Tomocyclus gealei Crosse & P. Fischer, 1872
 Tomocyclus guatemalensis (L. Pfeiffer, 1851)
 Tomocyclus lunai Bartsch, 1945
 Tomocyclus simulacrum (Morelet, 1849)
Synonyms
 Tomocyclus constrictus Bartsch & J. P. E. Morrison, 1942: synonym of Tomocyclus simulacrum (Morelet, 1849) (junior synonym)
 Tomocyclus copanensis (G. B. Sowerby I, 1850): synonym of Tomocyclus simulacrum (Morelet, 1849) (junior synonym)
 Tomocyclus siphonis Bartsch & J. P. E. Morrison, 1942: synonym of Tomocyclus simulacrum (Morelet, 1849) (junior synonym)

References

 Bank, R. A. (2017). Classification of the Recent terrestrial Gastropoda of the World. Last update: July 16th, 2017

External links
 Kobelt W. (1902). Das Tierreich. Eine Zusammenstellung und Kennzeichnung der rezenten Tierformen. 16. Lieferung. Mollusca. Cyclophoridae. Das Tierreich. XXXIX + 662 pp., 1 map

Megalomastomidae